The "Ballad of Eric" is a ballad found in Latin and Swedish about the legendary Gothic king, Erik. It was once seen as a valuable source for Migration Period history, but is now regarded as an inauthentic piece of fakelore created during the 16th century. 

The ballad was published for the first time in Latin by Johannes Magnus in his Historia de omnibus geotherm sueonumque regibus (1554). He states that the original was a song widely sung in Sweden at the time, but Johannes Magnus is not entirely reliable. The Latin text is composed of ten Sapphic stanzas. It tells the story of King Eric, whose career bears some similarities to a later king Berig whom Magnus claimed united the Swedes and Goths 400 years after Eric. Berig is also found in the Jordanes' 6th-century work Getica. According to the text, Eric, the first king of the Goths, sent troops southwards to a country named Vetala, where no one had yet cultivated the land. In their company there was a wise man, a lawspeaker, who was to uphold the law. Finally, the Gothic king Humli sent his son Dan to rule the settlers, and after Dan, Vetala was named Denmark. The first stanza says:
Primus in regnis Geticis coronam
Regiam gessi, subiique Regis
Munus, & mores colui sereno
Principe dignos.

The Swedish text is found in two different versions. One of them is found in Elaus Terserus' translation of Johannes Magnus' work, and this translation was done before 1611, but it was never published. The other one is found in Ericus Schroderus' translation of the same work, which was published in 1620. His version consists of ten five-line stanzas with the rhyme scheme , where the refrain C says "His was Vetala's first harvest." There are also several later documentations of the song, which are unfinished. One of them is found in Olof Verelius' work, in the annotations of the Hervarar saga ok Heiðreks, and the other one in Johan Hadorph's work (1690). Both of the versions are closely similar to Schroderus' version. Hadorph relates that the Eric song was still widely sung among the peasantry of Västergötland and Dalsland in the late 17th century.

In 1825, Erik Gustaf Geijer of the Geatish Society reproduced parts of the song. He believed that this was an ancient traditional text, and Geijer was a person of immense authority in Swedish academia. In an analysis of this song's weirdly archaic language in his 1848 PhD thesis, Carl Säve believed that the use of i and u instead of e and o indicated that it was first written down with the runic script. In 1853, Gunnar Olof Hyltén-Cavallius and George Stephens followed Säve. They had missed or just ignored that in 1850 P. A. Munch had argued that the ballad was dependent on the Prosaic Chronicle and suggested that it was composed ca 1449 or 1450. 

Henrik Schück initially accepted Munch's reasoning. However, he changed his mind, and argued in 1891 that everybody involved in presenting it lied about its wide currency and that it was composed by Johannes Magnus himself. After that, only Einar Nylén (1924) has tried to argue that a Swedish version existed before Johannes Magnus, but his opinion was rejected or ignored in subsequent scholarship.

Notes

Fakelore